The Beatles (also referred to as "The Beatles Cartoon") was a Saturday morning animated television series featuring representations of the popular English rock band of the same name. It was originally broadcast from 1965 to 1967 on ABC in the United States, with repeats airing until 1969. The series debuted on 25 September 1965 and new episodes ended on 21 October 1967. A total of 39 episodes were produced. The series was shown on Saturdays at 10:30 AM EST until the 1967 third season when it was moved to 12:00 PM EST. For the 1968–69 fourth season, which consisted of repeats, the series was shown at 9:30 AM EST on Sundays. Each episode has the name of a Beatles song, so the story is based on its lyrics and it is also played at some time in the episode. The original series was rebroadcast in syndication by MTV in 1986 and 1987 and on The Disney Channel beginning in 1989 on Fridays at 5 PM. The series was a historical milestone as the first weekly television series to feature animated versions of real, living people.

Production overview 
The series consisted of short animated stories that essentially were intended to set up the visual illustration of Beatles songs that were played in their entirety. In addition, there were sing-along sequences with simpler imagery complementing the full lyrics of particular songs. The songs were taken from all the albums up to Revolver as well as non-album singles up to "Strawberry Fields Forever"/"Penny Lane", the song "Bad Boy", the German language song "Komm Gib Mir Deine Hand", and the Long Tall Sally EP.

The series depicted the band in their early "moptop-and-suit" look as depicted in the 1964 live action film, A Hard Day's Night, even though the band had moved beyond it during the series' run.  The producers did attempt to acknowledge the band members' contemporary appearances with photographs of them in the series' title sequences during its production run.

The Beatles borrowed Richard Lester's fast-cutting directorial style of A Hard Day's Night and its 1965 follow-up, Help! Hal Erickson writes in Television Cartoon Shows that the frenetic cuts "[gave] the series its breezy pace and comic impudence — which often had to compensate for some distressingly sloppy animation and infantile scripting".

The band members themselves had nothing to do with the series' production beyond the use of their music recordings. US actor Paul Frees did the voices of John Lennon and George Harrison while Lance Percival did the voices of Paul McCartney and Ringo Starr. Frees had been the voice of Boris Badenov in The Adventures of Rocky and Bullwinkle and Friends series. The female voices were provided by Julie Bennett and Carol Corbett. At first, the Beatles dismissed the series because of its poor quality. It is reported, however, that the band members enjoyed the cartoons in later years.

Initially, the opening credits theme was a guitar riff from "A Hard Day's Night" segueing into "Can't Buy Me Love", over a cartoon sequence of the group running down a fire escape, echoing a scene in A Hard Day's Night. The second season's opening theme was "Help!", while the third season's theme was "And Your Bird Can Sing", over a different cartoon sequence.

Although uncredited, Dennis Marks, along with Jack Mendelsohn, Heywood Kling and Bruce Howard, wrote all 39 episodes of The Beatles series.

Most of the episodes of the series were produced by Artransa Park Studios in Sydney, New South Wales, Australia and George Dunning's company TVC Animation in London, with a handful of episodes made in Hollywood, with a crew supervised by veteran cartoon writer John W. Dunn.

Depiction of the Beatles 

Each Beatles figure was a loose, rough, exaggerated description of them, with John and Paul wearing a blue collar-less suit and tie, while George and Ringo wore navy blue shirts and light blue blazer jackets; all of them wore matching blue drainpipe trousers and Beatle Boots.

John Lennon 
John is described as being the leader. His mop-top is slightly shorter than that of the rest of the band. He has his chin up, looking down his nose, feet apart and hands on hips, and points and poses with his hands with a "showbiz" expression with a mocking gesture, especially when giving orders (showing John does not take his job as leader seriously), and is often malicious, especially towards George and Ringo. He slouches rather than sits. He will often pull funny faces and immediately wipe them off. John's movements are described as being short and slightly aggressive. His chin is rather bulbous, chubby and rounded and his eyes are rather small. Whenever he looks to the front he uses a sideways look to talk to somebody and looks away after giving an order. John's right eyebrow is connected to his nose and gives him a look suitable to his "real life" appearance.

He tends to use sarcastic, dry humour. He is also extremely lazy and overly laid-back. And yet, despite all that, he truly cares about the band members and will do anything for them.

Paul McCartney 
Paul is shown as second-in-command of the band. Paul is the most poised and stylish of the cartoon Beatles, and his mop-top is the neatest of the four of them.

He uses his hands, with his fingers spread apart, to express himself when talking. He is the one to get excited whenever John suggests something. He always looks straight at whomever he's talking to. His face is very fine, with his eyebrows wide and far apart and his eyes partly closed in an almost mockingly sad expression and they will only open fully when he is excited or frightened. His mop-top takes on a messier look and his eyes open wide when he is terrified. Paul sits like he's about to jump out and get on with whatever is happening. He does not really walk, he skips. When he is making his own suggestions or comments, especially when suggesting mischief, he covers up by assuming a mockingly innocent look; eyes wide and head tilted to one side. Whenever he gets especially excited, he will put his hand over his mouth.

Also like John, Paul uses a dry and sarcastic humour and is happy-go-lucky and rather laid-back. In spite of this, he will always help somebody when needed. Paul, along with Ringo, are the only Beatles who sound closest to their real-life counterparts.

His character is the only left-hander, while in real life both he and Ringo use their left hands.

George Harrison 
George's character has a more angular, wry figure, especially when he walks, his legs are long and thin (emphasis on the knees keeps his angular appearance). His mop-top is rather longer in the back compared to the other members of the band. He always leans against something, shoulders hunched, hands in pocket, legs crossed. He is also the same height as Paul. His shoulders are hunched when he is in a standing or a leaning pose, which can indicate direction and his head tilted forward. He has a crooked smile and is almost always giving the impression of frowning due to his characters eyebrows becoming thicker as they reach his nose. His chin is long and thin, with sunken cheeks, and his nose is tall and thin. He never looks at who he's speaking to and will close his eyes for short periods when talking. Notice the distance between his nose and his mouth; his mouth is lopsided.

He often uses dry, witty humour and succumbs to peer pressure. George is the only Beatle with a diverse accent that does not really fit with any accent in particular, but it sounds most similar to an Irish one. George has been shown to be fascinated with various cultures and is occasionally superstitious. He and Ringo are almost always made to do the work for John and Paul, such as in the episode "Do You Want to Know a Secret", they were the only ones carrying in the bands' extensive luggage into their vacation cottage. He cares a lot about the group members and will help them when they need him.

Ringo Starr 
Ringo is the most sympathetic Beatle. His mop-top is the longest and shaggiest (sometimes almost completely covering his eyes) of the four of them. He is the more calm, gentle, least aggressive, innocent, and more lovable Beatle. Ringo's nose and sad, goofy, expressive eyes are among his most prominent features along with his trademark, rather deep, goofy laugh, which is highly exaggerated. His face usually has a sad or goofy expression with his upper lip protruding in a wavy line. He does smile a lot, but when he does not he has a look of curiosity or sadness on his face. Ringo's expressions and humour are usually deadpan, but when expression is required, his eye position (eyes arched) are used to make a goofy expression whenever he laughs. Whenever he laughs, having made a funny remark, he squints.

Although being the eldest Beatle (three months before John), he is the smallest Beatle with a disjointed Groucho Marx-like figure. His neck is thin and gets smaller as it reaches the base of his neck, with his small chin sticking out a little, which is evidence of his disjointed figure. When he walks, his feet, legs, knees, arms and hands move loosely. Being responsible for the show's light-hearted humorous, or slapstick comical relief, after having bodily harm of any kind, his figure is crooked, bent or twisted into an, sometimes, unusual position. His clothes also often look a bit too big, especially his Beatle Boots and Blue Blazer Jacket.

During the song portions of the episodes (not the sing-along segments), he often shakes his head and mop-top around with a goofy expression when drumming. He gets along best with George, and he, like George, shows interest in various cultures.  He often makes bad puns and jokes (usually he's the only one laughing). During the introductions to the Sing-Along segments he substitutes for the prop-man (who is either on vacation, out sick or just not there) and sets the stage, literally, to John, Paul, or George's description, and more often than not, to their surprise or chagrin.

He is often the butt of the joke, victim of a prank, or just simply has bad luck. Ringo's character tends to have bad luck, often because of his naivety, curiosity and being unaware of the danger, mistake or threat. In the episode "Good Day Sunshine", he becomes depressed and upset, thinking he is a jinx for misfortunes, such as that it rained at Carny Island on the Beatles' weekends, (i.e. it rained at the piers fair every time Ringo arrived) and was described in that episode as being a "sourpuss". He felt better after John, Paul, and George sang "Good Day Sunshine" for him, and showed him how to have fun again.

It is revealed in "Money" that Ringo's mother dropped him as a baby ("Me mother dropped me once").

Ringo, like Paul, is also left-handed, although in "I'll Be Back" Ringo plays a guitar right-handed.

Brian Epstein 
Brian Epstein acts as the Beatles' manager. He is rarely seen or mentioned but he was mostly mentioned in the episode "Please Mr. Postman" when the Beatles ran out of money. Ringo had purchased 15 rings, which were later snapped by autograph collectors, and they needed to contact Epstein for money. Epstein finally makes his appearance in the episode "Thank You Girl" in the beginning of the episode, but only his arm is seen, again voiced by Paul Frees as he grounds the Beatles for gaining so much weight after dining on the French cooking. Epstein, himself, along with the other real-life Beatles, appear in a lost deleted scene featuring the production of the animated Beatles cartoons at the end.

His fictionalized animated version of his appearance and habit of smoking is a homage and based on the animated series' creator, Al Brodax.

List of episodes and Sing Alongs 
 * Songs in episodes with no Sing Along counterparts
 ** Songs in Sing Alongs with no episode counterparts

Season 1 (1965–66) 
1. A Hard Day's Night / I Want to Hold Your Hand:
While in Transylvania, The Beatles try rehearsing in a haunted house with "monstrous" visitors, including a vampire, a ghost, a werewolf, and a witch, with a parody of Boris Karloff; To hide from their fans, the Beatles run inside a diving bell, which drops them into the ocean with a lovesick octopus.
Sing Alongs: Not A Second Time / Devil In Her Heart

2. Do You Want To Know A Secret / If I Fell:
The Beatles go to Dublin, Ireland for the weekend where they meet a female leprechaun named Wilhelmina Morris; John is kidnapped by Dr. Dora Florahyde and Igor, who want John's brain for their monster. In the I Want To Hold Your Hand Sing Along, Ringo is shown inside a submarine.
Sing Alongs: A Hard Day's Night / I Want To Hold Your Hand

3. Please Mr. Postman / Devil In Her Heart:
Ringo loses 15 rings he bought with all of the Beatles' earnings and they are expecting a telegram from manager Brian Epstein for more money; While in Transylvania, Ringo wanders into the woods, where he meets a witch who wants him for a husband.
Sing Alongs: If I Fell / Do You Want To Know A Secret

4. Not A Second Time / Slow Down:
Trying to get away from their fans, The Beatles abandon their flight and land in Africa, but three girls keep tracking them down; The Beatles are on the way to the town Ringo Ravine (named after Ringo) until they encounter a donkey named "Gold Nose" that smells gold".
Sing Alongs: Baby's In Black / Misery

5. Baby's In Black / Misery:
Paul gets kidnapped by Professor Psycho, who wants Paul to marry his creation Vampiress, half girl and half bat; The Beatles go to a wax museum to see themselves, but a vampire who's hiding there from the police chases them.
Sing Alongs: I'll Get You / Chains

6. You've Really Got A Hold On Me / Chains:
In Africa, Ringo asks a medicine maker named Jack to help fix the Beatles' flat tire. Jack then turns a worm into a snake and it lusts for Ringo; On a cruise ship, Ringo gets accidentally knocked out and dreams that he's Captain Bligh from the movie Mutiny on the Bounty (1962).
Sing Alongs: Slow Down / Honey Don't

7. I'll Get You / Honey Don't:
In Africa after escaping from their fans, The Beatles run into hunter Alan Watermain (a parody of the H. Rider Haggard character Allan Quatermain) and go out big-game hunting; Ringo is mistaken as a bull rider,
and the cowboys send him to ride on a super-tough bull named Honey.
Sing Alongs: You've Really Got A Hold On Me / Any Time At All

8. Any Time At All / Twist and Shout:
The Beatles imagine themselves as the Three Musketeers (Plus One) while they are on a tour at a museum in France and try to rescue a "lady in distress"; The Beatles attend an art show where a girl tries to be like other artists, so they inspire her with music.
Sing Alongs: I'll Be Back / Little Child

9. Little Child / I'll Be Back:
A Native American girl on a Texas Indian reservation wants to prove that girls are as good at trapping as boys are by trapping the Beatles; The mayor of a Texas town gives Ringo a golden guitar as a gift, only for it to be stolen by three men, prompting the Fab Four to hunt for the thieves and get the guitar back. (The song "Ticket to Ride" is heard at the beginning of this episode.)
Sing Alongs: Long Tall Sally / Twist And Shout

10. Long Tall Sally / I'll Cry Instead:
While The Beatles are staying at a castle for the night during a fog, John and Ringo try on a couple of cursed armor suits and start to fight each other; After signing too many autographs in Japan, George's hand gets swollen and suffers "autographitis", so his bandmates take him to a hand doctor but end up in a karate class by mistake.
Sing Alongs: I'll Follow The Sun / When I Get Home

11. I'll Follow the Sun / When I Get Home:
The Beatles' car breaks down and they are captured by a highwayman who happens to be a car repairman; The Beatles explore Notre Dame in Paris where they later meet its famous hunchback Quasimodo.
Sing Alongs: I'll Cry Instead / Everybody's Trying To Be My Baby

12. Everybody's Trying To Be My Baby / I Should Have Known Better:
After spending the night at a temple in Japan during a rainstorm, The Beatles are mistaken for the ancestors of four girls; The Beatles are in Rome trying to find a theater to rehearse, and their last resort is the Coliseum.
Sing Alongs: I'm A Loser / I Wanna Be Your Man

13. I'm A Loser / I Wanna Be Your Man:
In Hollywood, Ringo gets hired as a stuntman by Incredible Pictures Inc. and keeps getting pulverized in many scenes; In Rome, the Beatles buy a statue of the Goddess of Music made from stolen gold coins melted down and sculptured.
Sing Alongs: No Reply / I'm Happy Just To Dance With You

14. Don't Bother Me / No Reply:
The Beatles are in a rush to get to Barcelona from Rome, but they're being chased by two spies who are after their songbook "New Beatle Songs", marked "Top Secret" (The Beatles movie Help! and Oddjob from the James Bond movie Goldfinger are spoofed); In Japan, The Beatles are warned by a Charlie Chan-lookalike police detective about a master-of-disguise jewel thief named Anyface, and things become complicated when Anyface shows up disguised as Paul.
Sing Alongs: It Won't Be Long / I Should Have Known Better

15. I'm Happy Just To Dance With You / Mr. Moonlight:
The Beatles are in a Roman street festival where Paul wins a dancing bear named Bonnie; The Beatles meet Professor Ludwig Von Brilliant, who is on a mission to view an eclipse. After being adrift at sea, they escape from an island on a submarine.
Sing Alongs: Don't Bother Me / Can't Buy Me Love

16. Can't Buy Me Love / It Won't Be Long:
John is given a friendship ring from a Polynesian tribal chief, which means he must marry the chief's New York-accented daughter who dislikes pineapples; While picnicking in Japan, John goes for a swim in a pond with shrinking potion in it and gets shrunk, making the other Beatles think John is a Beatle doll and chase after him.
Sing Alongs: Anna (Go to Him) / Mr. Moonlight

17. Anna / I Don't Want To Spoil The Party:
In Japan when Paul gets lured into a ghost ship called "Ah-Nah", the other Beatles dash off to the rescue before they lose Paul for good; Rather than go with John to a museum, Paul, George and Ringo sneak away and go to Greenwich Village for some fun time at a Beatnik party.
Sing Alongs: Matchbox / Thank You Girl

18. Matchbox / Thank You Girl:
In Hawaii, rather than stay at hotels, John buys a trailer for the group to stay in. They later encounter a group of Hawaiians who are evacuating from a volcano; When they sneak away from their manager to get something to eat at a French restaurant, The Beatles somehow enroll in a cooking course.
Sing Alongs: I Don't Want To Spoil The Party / Help!

19. From Me To You / Boys*:
In Hawaii, a surfer named Surf Wolf challenges George to a surfing duel; The Beatles participate in a Mr. Hollywood Contest in California.
Sing Alongs: Please Mr. Postman / I Saw Her Standing There
Note: The opening title erroneously shows "With Love From Me To You"

20. Dizzy Miss Lizzy / I Saw Her Standing There:
John and Paul secretly sign George up to an ice boat race, and he partners up with a girl named Lizzy; In Madrid, when John and Paul visit a restaurant, John develops a hot foot with ashes in his boot and a woman named Rosita falls for him, causing her boyfriend Jose to challenges John to a duel.
Sing Alongs: Ticket To Ride / From Me To You

21. What You're Doing / Money*:
While The Beatles are on a fishing trip, Ringo runs into gypsies, one of whom falls for him and wants to marry him, so to save Ringo George comes in as a woman claiming he is engaged to Ringo; John puts Ringo in charge of keeping their money safe in his jacket pocket, but Ringo later is being followed by a mystery man at a carnival who is after the money. (The song "Help!" is heard at the beginning of this episode.)
Sing Alongs: Dizzy Miss Lizzy / All My Loving

22. Komm Gib Mir Deine Hand* / She Loves You:
The Beatles visit the Bavarian Alps and end up on a mission to climb up a mountain with the dog Gunthar to put up their own flag on top. (The song "Slow Down" is heard in the background); On board a ship, The Beatles are about to rescue a girl who they think is held as a prisoner, resulting in her boyfriend, a knife thrower, coming to
her defense...with knives.
Sing Alongs: Bad Boy / Tell Me Why

23. Bad Boy / Tell Me Why:
In the Bavarian Alps again, The Beatles encounter a runaway named Hans who wants to be a Beatle, prompting The Fab Four to run after him with their music (in which Paul plays the bass right-handed) and take him back home; In Spain, Ringo is the jockey of a donkey that can run like a horse whenever she hears loud music. (Before the song begins, the count-off is taken from "I Saw Her Standing There".)
Sing Alongs: Please Please Me / Hold Me Tight

24. I Feel Fine / Hold Me Tight:
Paul thinks Hollywood's all phony, and actor Dick Dashing attempts to prove him wrong by putting Paul in some different movie scenes; In New York, George and Ringo visit the Statue of Liberty, where they spot a man with a package which they think is a bomb.
Sing Alongs: What You're Doing / There's A Place

25. Please Please Me / There's A Place:
In Madrid, a bull named El Taco gets knocked out, and the Beatles decide to help out the bullfight with Ringo as the matador and John and Paul as the bull; John's sympathy helps a trained ape named Mr. Marvelous to escape from the television studio and go exploring the outside world.
Sing Alongs: Roll Over Beethoven / Rock and Roll Music

26. Roll Over Beethoven / Rock and Roll Music:
The Beatles are on their way home after visiting New York City until Paul gets grabbed by an elephant named Beethoven (Before the song begins, the count-off is taken from "I Saw Her Standing There".); The Beatles are invited to play at the Duke's Palace, but they are mistaken for a string quartet.
Sing Alongs: I Feel Fine / She Loves You

Season 2 (1966) 
27. Eight Days A Week / I'm Looking Through You:
A great movie lover named Lips Lovelace loses his ability to kiss.  Paul decides to take his place in the studio with a leading lady who falls for him; The Beatles are in Egypt.  They are wandering around in a pyramid until Ringo encounters a ghost who wants a body, and he chooses Ringo's.
Sing Alongs: Run For Your Life / Girl**

28. Help! / We Can Work It Out:
Paul and Ringo go to a fashion show in Paris, but the designs are stolen by a thief named Jacques Le Zipper.  Paul chases Jacques to the Eiffel Tower, and has trouble with heights; George becomes superstitious.  The Beatles encounter the Lucky Wizard who is really a thief trying to give them bad luck and rob their money.
Sing Alongs: The Night Before** / Day Tripper

29. I'm Down* / Run For Your Life:
The Beatles are on a tour at a wine factory in France where Ringo accidentally
knocks down a vat of wine.  If it does not get fixed in two hours, the
factory will go out of business;  The Beatles are on a tour at the
Palace of Versailles.  Ringo gets knocked out by a statue, and
dreams about the days of Marie Antoinette.
Sing Alongs: Eight Days A Week / Paperback Writer

30. Drive My Car* / Tell Me What You See*:
The Beatles help a young man and his girlfriend get their
old jalopy running in a car race, the Popsville Hot Rod Race; While visiting "the man
of a thousand faces", The Beatles fool around with his makeup
machine and change into different characters. (John briefly imitates Jimmy Durante and Swee'Pea from "Popeye" makes a cameo.)
Sing Alongs: Yesterday** / We Can Work It Out

31. I Call Your Name* / The Word*:
Ringo is convinced to release his pet frog Bartholomew in the
swamp.  Later a movie producer offers a filming deal to Ringo
and the frog, and the Fabs have dashed off to find Bartholomew; The Beatles are being punished after gazing at the girls' unveiled faces.  The only way to get out of the situation is to say the password: "love".
Sing Alongs: She's a Woman** (original broadcast, replaced in later broadcasts with a repeat of I Feel Fine) / Wait

32. All My Loving / Day Tripper:
The Beatles are in India where they learn how to charm
an animal at an "Indian Charm Skool".  When the animal is revealed to be a tiger, they use
music to tame it when it is about to claw John and Ringo (The song "Love You To" is heard in the beginning of this episode.); After watching the movie The Way Out Creatures From Planet Glom, the Beatles take a trip out into space with a beautiful woman who
is actually an alien taking them on a one-way trip 23 billion miles from Earth.
Sing Alongs: I'm Looking Through You / Nowhere Man

33. Nowhere Man / Paperback Writer:
The Beatles walk into a cave for some exploring which is a home
of a hermit who wants to be alone.  He tries to get rid of them, but
no luck; Each of the Beatles write fictional stories of how they met
with Ringo as a theatre actor, Paul as a scientist, George as a secret
agent, and John as a war pilot.
Sing Alongs: And I Love Her** / Michelle**

Season 3 (1967) 
34. Penny Lane / Strawberry Fields:
In a spoof of James Bond, the Beatles are jealous of a detective named James Blonde who
gets more attention from many women, so the Fab Four head to their hometown of Liverpool to
stop a robbery on Penny Lane so they can be heroes; Traveling with their driver James, the
Beatles use music to add colour and happiness to the lives of the children at an orphanage, a reference to Strawberry Field in Woolton, a suburb of Liverpool.  John sums up the experience with "It's all in the mind, you know."
Sing Alongs: Good Day Sunshine / Rain**

35. And Your Bird Can Sing / Got To Get You Into My Life:
The Beatles and a couple of hunters hunt for a rare
bird called a green double-breasted tropical woosted that can sing
anything, including "Hound Dog" and "She Loves You"; The Beatles are in India, learning how to escape from
their bodies from Swami Rivers.  It works, but the problem is that the souls' bodies
are moving by themselves, and they must get them before it's
too late. ("Love You To" is heard in the background)
Sing Alongs: Penny Lane / Eleanor Rigby

36. Good Day Sunshine / Ticket To Ride:
Ringo thinks he's a jinx. When the Beatles arrive at Carney Island, it starts to rain (for the fourth weekend in a row), but the boys' music turns the rainy day back into a sunny day which makes Ringo happy. (The song "Little Child" is heard at the end of this episode.); The Beatles each have their own hobby: Paul paints, George builds a three-eyed robot, John writes and Ringo collects "birds" (which is English slang for girls). Paul releases the only one Ringo caught and he runs after her.
Sing Alongs: Strawberry Fields Forever / And Your Bird Can Sing

37. Taxman* / Eleanor Rigby:
The Beatles are delivering tons of money to pay their income tax. When they get knocked out by flying money bags, they  dream they're back in the days of Robin Hood, but Paul keeps insisting "He never happened!"; A group of children claim that an elderly woman named Eleanor Rigby is a witch. The Fab Four tell them the truth about Eleanor Rigby in a song and get them to see her in a new way. (The song "I Feel Fine" is heard at the end of this episode.)
Sing Alongs: Got To Get You Into My Life / Here, There and Everywhere**

38. Tomorrow Never Knows* / I've Just Seen a Face*:
The Beatles fall into a well and end up in the inner world with
foreign natives (Maya civilization). The chief wants the Fabs to marry his daughters, and
they began to run away. (The song "Love You To" is heard during this episode.); Ringo loses his singing voice. For treatment,
his three mates send Ringo to a haunted house to scare his voice
back.
Sing Alongs: She Said She Said** / Long Tall Sally (repeat)

39. Wait / I'm Only Sleeping*:
The Prince of Krapotkin's girlfriend is in grave danger.  The Beatles help
him to save her from the Prime Minister who wants to marry
her; John falls asleep while telling a story to a couple of children.  In his dream
he volunteers to help King Arthur and Merlin slay a vicious dragon.  However,
John and his mates opt instead to play music to put the dragon to sleep.
Sing Alongs: Penny Lane (repeat) / Eleanor Rigby (repeat)

Reception 
The series was an instant ratings hit on ABC in the Saturday morning time slot after it debuted on 25 September 1965 at 10:30 AM ET. It racked up a 13 score (or 52 share), then unheard of in daytime television. The series was sponsored by the A. C. Gilbert Company, the Quaker Oats Company and the Mars Candy Company. For the third season in 1967, the series was moved to Saturdays at noon.

Originally, the Beatles disliked the cartoon; however, as time went on they grew to like it. In 1972, Lennon commented, "I still get a blast out of watching the Beatles cartoons on TV." In 1999, Harrison said, "I always kind of liked [the cartoons]. They were so bad or silly that they were good, if you know what I mean, and I think the passage of time might make them more fun now."

The series was syndicated worldwide on television and cable after the original run ended in 1969. In 1986 and 1987, new generations were introduced to the series when it was rebroadcast in syndication by MTV and also by The Disney Channel. On MTV, the series was shown on Saturday and Sunday mornings at 10 AM ET or 7 AM PT. On The Disney Channel, the series was shown on Fridays at 5 PM beginning in 1989. Mark Hamill was a guest host of the MTV run of the series in 1987.

Legacy 
The Beatles' views of the cartoon series discouraged them from participating significantly in the later animated feature film, Yellow Submarine, whose producer, Al Brodax, and director, George Dunning, had also been involved in the production of the animated series. Only when the band saw and were impressed by the Yellow Submarine's finished footage did they realize the film was a more ambitious creation. As a result, they agreed to appear in a short live-action epilogue for it.

Lance Percival provided the voice of Fred in that film.

While the series remained popular in syndication worldwide, the Internet has allowed for even more exposure due to its so bad it's good nature. Due to the nature of the show and the Beatles' enduring popularity as a band, the series has recently gained a cult following online. The series was available on YouTube and on online websites, but most episodes have since been removed due to copyright infringement; some who uploaded episodes and clips elected to mute out or remove the musical scenes, in order to obey the copyright rules of the musical recordings (though the episodes themselves are still under copyright).

In December 2004, McFarlane Toys released a line of figures based on the cartoon series, featuring all four band members with instruments. In 2005, they released a boxed set featuring cartoon figures of all four band members with instruments, plus an alligator figure, speakers, and a radio. Apple Corps Ltd. purchased the rights to the series in the early 1990s. There has been popular demand for Apple Corps to issue a remastered release of the series on DVD.

References

Sources 
 DenniLu Company. Officially Licensed by Apple Corps Ltd.
 Axelrod, Mitchell. Beatletoons: The Real Story Behind The Cartoon Beatles. Wynn, 1999.
 Lenburg, Jeff. Encyclopedia Of Animated Cartoons. Checkmark Books, 1999.
 Lehman, Christopher P. American Animated Cartoons of the Vietnam Era: A Study of Social Commentary in Films and Television Programs, 1961–1973. McFarland, 2007.
 TV.com. 
 The Big Cartoon Database.

External links 
 
 The Beatles (Cartoon Series) (1965), televisionheaven.co.uk feature.
 Garn's Guides.
 The Cartoon Scrapbook featuring The Beatles TV series.
 The background of The Beatles cartoon television series.
 Reference Library: Beatles Cartoons.
 Cartoon Beatles artwork.

1960s American animated television series
1960s American musical comedy television series
1965 American television series debuts
1967 American television series endings
1960s British animated television series
1965 British television series debuts
1967 British television series endings
American children's animated comedy television series
American children's animated musical television series
British children's animated comedy television series
British children's animated musical television series
Animation based on real people
Television series based on singers and musicians
Animated musical groups
American Broadcasting Company original programming
Television programmes about the Beatles
Cultural depictions of the Beatles
English-language television shows
Sing-along television shows